"As I Lay Me Down" is a song composed and performed by American singer-songwriter Sophie B. Hawkins. It was released in February 1995 as the third single from her second album, Whaler (1994), and also appears on The Best of Sophie B. Hawkins (2002). The song is one of her two biggest hits, reaching number six on the US Billboard Hot 100 and number one on the Billboard Adult Contemporary chart for six weeks during 1995. Outside the United States, the song reached number six in Canada, number seven in Australia, number 19 in New Zealand, and number 24 in the United Kingdom. Its music video was directed by Sophie Muller.

Release
The song is a pop ballad in which the singer reminisces about a faraway loved one as she goes to bed and hopes to see him again. It was written in memory of her father. It was the second US single released from the album Whaler. With disappointing sales of the first single, "Right Beside You", the song was released with little fanfare (a photograph of Sophie dressed as a sailor was the focus of the cover). Sophie then insisted that her label (Columbia) allow her to tour the country with only an acoustic piano. The song then began receiving airplay on adult contemporary stations. During the mid-1995, it became an adult contemporary hit as well as a top-10 single in the United States. A remix also helped the song gain airplay on other kinds of stations. It was also included on the album All Time Greatest Movie Songs, released by Columbia Records in 1999.

Critical reception
Steve Baltin from Cash Box named "As I Lay Me Down" Pick of the Week, describing it as "a lovely song, gentle as its title indicates. The keyboard music that drives the song behind Hawkins’ vocals calls to mind the Police’s “Every Little Thing She Does Is Magic"." He wrote further that it's "a refreshing change of pace for the singer-songwriter, who has not received the same attention for this album as for her first simply because she doesn't fit neatly into any category. While this single doesn't necessarily change that, its easygoing and lighthearted charm may help Hawkins to reepature [sic] some of the magic as A/C [sic] and Top 40 should have a place for this one." Peter Galvin from Entertainment Weekly gave the song an A– rating, stating that the synth-pop hymn "has resuscitated her career. A tribute to her father, the song has a lovely, lulling melody that more than compensates for Hawkins’ shallow vocals." 

Fell and Rufer from the Gavin Report concluded, "Here's the track that will make Hawkins a definitive A/C artist. It may be easy on the ear, and the sentiment is wistful and hopeful. Should do well and play forever at A/C." Chuck Campbell from Knoxville News Sentinel said that listeners "might get a sugar high off" of the "saccharine" "As I Lay Me Down". In his weekly UK chart commentary, James Masterton felt that it's "the kind of gentle ballad that is either best appreciated first thing in the morning or at the end of a long tired day. If nothing else in the chart deserves to go Top 20 – this certainly does."

Music video
The accompanying music video for "As I Lay Me Down" was directed by English director Sophie Muller. It depicts Hawkins singing while sitting on stairs outside an apartment building in her hometown of New York City. It flashes to Hawkins in a forest swinging on a swing, lying on a tree branch, sitting in a boat, and sitting on a bench. It also shows a little girl running through the forest representing Hawkins as a child.

Track listings

US CD and cassette single
 "As I Lay Me Down"
 "I Need Nothing Else"

UK CD1
 "As I Lay Me Down"
 "Miles Away" (demo version)
 "Damn I Wish I Was Your Lover" (live version)
 "True Romance"

UK CD2
 "As I Lay Me Down"
 "Before I Walk on Fire" (live version)
 "Right Beside You" (demo version)
 "True Romance"

UK cassette single and European CD single
 "As I Lay Me Down" – 4:09
 "True Romance" – 2:23

Australian CD single
 "As I Lay Me Down"
 "Before I Walk on Fire" (live version)
 "Right Beside You" (demo version)
 "Damn I Wish I Was Your Lover" (live version)

Charts

Weekly charts

Year-end charts

Certifications

Release history

Usage in media
It appeared in Now and Then and the TV series Party of Five (with Hawkins performing it as a guest star) in 1995 and the 1998 pilot of Dawson's Creek. Hawkins also performed the songs "Damn I Wish I Was Your Lover" and "As I Lay Me Down" in the season 4 episode 8 "Herstory of Dance" of the television show Community. In the episode, Britta organizes a "Sophie B. Hawkins" dance in protest to Greendale's "Sadie Hawkins" dance. It also appeared in the original episode 4 of the webseries The Gay and Wondrous Life of Caleb Gallo.

References

External links
 Full lyrics at official website
 Ask Sophie – December 2004 – with some questions related to "As I Lay Me Down"

1990s ballads
1995 singles
Columbia Records singles
Music videos directed by Sophie Muller
Pop ballads
Song recordings produced by Stephen Lipson
Songs written by Sophie B. Hawkins
Sophie B. Hawkins songs